Lars Gunnar "Lasse" Lönndahl (pronounced Lah-seh; 19 August 1928 – 26 December 2022) was a Swedish singer and actor. He was considered the most well-known Swedish singer of the 1950s and 1960s with nicknames including "The Swedish Frank Sinatra" and "World's Oldest Teenager". Even though by the mid-1970s his career had slowed down, he was still considered arguably Sweden's most popular singer of all time and was long a very popular figure in media.

Career
Lönndahl was born in Stockholm. His breakthrough was in 1949 with his first record, "", which reached #2 in Sweden. After that he became one of the leading faces in popular music, scoring 12 #2 hit singles in the 1950s. He also made some movies in the late 1950s.

In the 1960s, he became the first singer to have a #1 single on the new Swedish chart Svensktoppen (the most important Swedish chart) with the 1962 single "". It stayed a total of 18 weeks in the charts. Between the years 1962 and 1972 he had 35 songs on the chart, with a total of 37.

Personal life
Lönndahl was born in Stockholm to a Swedish mother and an English father. His father left the family early and Lönndahl rarely saw him. Lönndahl remembers his father as a man who rarely worked and lived off his wife before absconding. After Lönndahl found fame, his father tried reconnecting with his son, asking him for money. Lönndahl however, never connected with his father again as he believed too much time had passed and that his father's appearance came much too late. In late 1970, Lönndahl's seven-year-old daughter Malin and her mother died in a car accident in Los Angeles, California. After the incident, Lönndahl for a period of time went into a self-imposed exile to the United States, eluding the Swedish press. He subsequently returned to Sweden but refused to record new material, claiming it was too "onerous to be Sweden's greatest singer".

Lönndahl died on 26 December 2022, at the age of 94.

Awards 
Lönndahl was awarded the Illis quorum in 1993.

Number 1 hits
1949: ""
1952: ""
1953: ""
1953: "That's Amore"
1954: ""
1956: ""
1957: "Kärleksbrev i sanden" ("Love Letters in the Sand")
1957: ""
1957: ""
1958: "Volare"
1958: "Piccolissima Serenata"
1959: ""
1959: "Flickor bak i bilen" ("Seven Little Girls Sitting in the Backseat")
1962: ""
1964: ""
1964: ""
1966: ""
1967: ""
1970: ""

Filmography
1952: 
1956: 
1957: 
1959: 
1959: Swinging at the Castle
1960: 
1966:

See also
List of Swedes in music

References

External Links
 
 

1928 births
2022 deaths
Swedish male actors
Swedish male singers
Swedish people of English descent
Melodifestivalen contestants
Recipients of the Illis quorum
Musicians from Stockholm